Citizens United for Research in Epilepsy, which goes by the name CURE Epilepsy, is a nonprofit organization based in Chicago, Illinois. The organization is focused on raising awareness and funds for research targeting a cure for epilepsy.  It was founded in September 1998 by Susan Axelrod and other parents who were searching for answers to protect their children from seizures and the side effects of epilepsy medications. 

CURE Epilepsy raises money through gala events.  By 2021 it had raised over $78 million and had funded over 260 research projects in 16 countries around the globe.

References

External links 

Epilepsy organizations
Non-profit organizations based in Chicago
Scientific organizations established in 1998
1998 establishments in the United States